Enric Gallego Puigsech (born 12 September 1986) is a Spanish professional footballer who plays as a striker for CD Tenerife.

Club career

Early career
Born in Barcelona, Catalonia, Gallego had several working-class jobs alongside his amateur footballing career, such as lorry driver, builder and air conditioning installer. He made his senior debut with UD Buen Pastor in the 2006–07 season, in the regional leagues. In January 2009, he joined Tercera División club CE Premià after a prolific spell at Alzamora CF.

In June 2009, Gallego signed for RCD Espanyol and was immediately assigned to their reserves in Segunda División B. After featuring sparingly, he moved to UE Cornellà of the fourth division, scoring five goals in a 6–0 away win against FC Ascó on 31 October 2010. He remained a regular in the following years as well as acting as captain a being a locker room reference, as his team missed out promotion in 2013.

On 8 July 2013, Gallego agreed a contract with division three side CF Badalona, where he had already played as a youth. On 25 June 2014, he moved to UE Olot in the same tier, before moving back to Cornellà the following January.

Extremadura
On 2 January 2018, Gallego joined Extremadura UD also in the third division, after the club triggered his €200,000 release clause. He scored 28 goals in total during the campaign, and achieved promotion to the Segunda División with Extremadura.

Gallego made his debut as a full-time professional at the age of 31 years and 11 months on 24 August 2018, starting in a 0–1 home loss against Deportivo de La Coruña. He scored his first goal in the second tier on 9 September, in a 1–3 defeat to Granada CF at the Estadio Francisco de la Hera.

On 22 September 2018, Gallego scored a hat-trick in a 4–1 away rout of CF Rayo Majadahonda, and added four goals in a 4–1 victory at CF Reus Deportiu on 17 November. He was awarded the Player of the Month accolade for December.

Huesca
On 16 January 2019, Gallego signed a two-and-a-half-year deal with La Liga strugglers SD Huesca, for a rumoured fee of €2 million. Three days later, he made his debut in the league, starting in a 0–3 home loss against Atlético Madrid. He scored his first goal in the competition on 1 February, the opener in a 4–0 home win over Real Valladolid.

Getafe
On 8 July 2019, Gallego agreed to a three-year contract with Getafe CF after his €6 million release clause was met. He made his debut for the club on 18 August, playing 11 minutes in a 1–0 defeat at Atlético Madrid.

Gallego's maiden appearance in the UEFA Europa League occurred on 19 September 2019, as he started in a 1–0 home win against Trabzonspor in the group stage.

Osasuna
On 28 January 2020, after being rarely used, Gallego was loaned to fellow league team CA Osasuna with an obligatory buyout clause if the team avoid relegation. In July, after this was achieved, he signed a permanent contract until 2022 for a €2 million fee.

Gallego left the El Sadar Stadium on 12 August 2021, having scored four times from 40 matches.

Tenerife
On 24 August 2021, Gallego agreed to a two-year deal at second-tier CD Tenerife.

International career
In March 2019, Gallego was called up to the Catalonia representative team for a friendly against Venezuela. However, Huesca refused to let him and Álex Gallar take part in the match.

References

External links

1986 births
Living people
Spanish footballers
Footballers from Barcelona
Association football forwards
La Liga players
Segunda División players
Segunda División B players
Tercera División players
Divisiones Regionales de Fútbol players
CE Premià players
RCD Espanyol B footballers
UE Cornellà players
CF Badalona players
UE Olot players
Extremadura UD footballers
SD Huesca footballers
Getafe CF footballers
CA Osasuna players
CD Tenerife players
Bricklayers
Spanish bricklayers